The 33rd Moscow International Film Festival was held from 23 June to 2 July 2011. The Golden George was awarded to the Venezuelan drama film  The Waves directed by Alberto Morais.

The festival opened with Transformers: Dark of the Moon directed by Michael Bay. The festival honoured Helen Mirren with Stanislavsky Award and closed with her film The Debt directed by John Madden.

Jury

Main Competition Jury
The members of main competition jury: 
 Geraldine Chaplin (United States, United Kingdom) - Chairman of the Jury
 Amos Gitai (Israel)
 Nikolai Dostal (Russian)
 Károly Makk (Hungary)
 Javier Martin Dominguez (Spain)

"Perspectives" Competition Jury
The members of "Perspectives" Competition Jury: 
 Miroljub Vuckovic (Serbia) - Chairman of the Jury
 Alexander Kott (Russian)
 Ermek Shinarbayev (Kazakhstan)

Documentary competition Jury
The members of Documentary competition Jury: 
 Michael Apted (United Kingdom)
 Tue Steen Müller (Denmark)
 Alexander Gutman (Russian)

Films in competition
The following films were selected for the main competition:

The following films were selected for the Perspectives competition:

The following films were selected for the Documentary competition:

Non-Competing Programmes

8 ½ Films
 Carlos directed by Olivier Assayas	
 Lozhkovilka directed by Yasbir Singh Ghuman Jr.
 Melancholia directed by Lars von Trier	
 The Mill and the Cross directed by Lech Majewski	
 Once Upon a Time in Anatolia directed by Nuri Bilge Ceylan	
 Neds directed by Peter Mullan	
 Pina directed by Wim Wenders	
 Black Venus directed by Abdellatif Kechiche	
 Walk away Renée directed by Jonathan Caouette

Werner Herzog, The Adventurer
Aguirre, the Wrath of God 
The White Diamond
Woyzeck 
Cobra Verde 
The Enigma of Kaspar Hauser
My Son, My Son, What Have Ye Done? 
Cave of Forgotten Dreams
Bad Lieutenant: Port of Call New Orleans 
Heart of Glass 
Stroszek 
Where the Green Ants Dream 
Fitzcarraldo

Sam Peckinpah
The Ballad of Cable Hogue
The Wild Bunch
Convoy
Major Dundee
Junior Bonner
The Getaway
Bring Me the Head of Alfredo Garcia
Pat Garrett and Billy the Kid
Ride the High Country
Straw Dogs
The Killer Elite

Wild Nights
 Love.net directed by	Ilian Djevelekov	
 Michael directed by Markus Schleinzer	
 Bedevilled directed by Jang Cheol-soo	
 6 Days on Earth directed by Varo Venturi	
 I Saw the Devil directed by Kim Jee-woon

Gala
 Arrietty directed by Hiromasa Yonebayashi	
 The Artist directed by Michel Hazanavicius	
 The Beaver directed by Jodie Foster	
 Vallanzasca – Gli angeli del male directed by	Michele Placido	
 Mishen directed by Alexander Zeldovich	
 Five brides directed by Karen Hovhannisyan

The festival also included Italian cinema today, Media Forum, New wave, Russian Film Program, Films of world cinema (showcasing films which contains elements of Russian culture), Free Thought, Made in Spain and Short Films Corner.

Tributes and Honors

Helen Mirren
Helen Mirren was honored at the festival and four of her films were screened at the festival, including the festival's closing night film The Debt.

The Tempest directed by Julie Taymor	
The Queen directed by	Stephen Frears	
The Last Station directed by Michael Hoffman

Rob Nilsson
The festival paid Tribute to American film director Rob Nilsson and screened four of his films at the festival.

Heat and Sunlight
Northern Lights
Need
Imbued

Béla Tarr
The festival paid Tribute to Hungarian film director Béla Tarr.

 Szabadgyalog / The Outsider
 Werckmeister harmóniák / Werckmeister Harmonies
 Panelkapcsolat / The Prefab People
 Macbeth 
 Őszi almanach / Autumn Almanac 
 Kárhozat / Damnation
 Sátántangó / Satan's Tango
 Családi tűzfészek / Family Nest
 A torinói ló / The Turin Horse
 A londoni férfi / The Man from London

Awards
The winners at the festival:
 Golden George: The Waves by Alberto Morais
 Special Jury Prize: Silver George: Chapiteau Show by Sergei Loban
 Silver George:
 Best Director: Wong Ching-po for Revenge: A Love Story
 Best Actor: Carlos Álvarez-Nóvoa for The Waves
 Best Actress: Urszula Grabowska for Joanna
 Jury Special Mention: Ivan Vladimirov and Valeri Yordanov for Sneakers
 Best film of the Perspective competition: Anarchy in Zhirmunai by Saulius Drunga
 Special mention of the jury: Bugs by Andrew Bogatirev
 Best film of the documentary competition: Hell and Back Again by Danfung Dennis
 Lifetime Achievement Award: John Malkovich
 Stanislavsky Award: Helen Mirren
 People's Choice Award: Montevideo, God Bless You! by Dragan Bjelogrlić

References

External links
Moscow International Film Festival: 2011 at Internet Movie Database
1 (82) 
2 (83) 
3 (84)
4 (85)
5 (86) 
6 (87) 
7 (88)

2011
2011 film festivals
2011 festivals in Asia
2011 festivals in Europe
Mos
2011 in Moscow
June 2011 events in Russia
July 2011 events in Russia